"It's Not That Easy" is a 1967 song by Reuben Bell with his backing group The Casanovas. The song was written by Bell, produced by Heads Up Productions and Dee Marais, was released with "Hummin' A Sad Song", also written by Bell on Murco Records as his debut 45". The song became one of Bell's best known songs, and emblematic of his high tenor voice. Dave Godin selected the song for his Dave Godin's Deep Soul Treasures : Taken from the Vaults Vol.1 compilation.

References

1967 singles
1967 songs